Babe Comes Home is a 1927 American silent sports comedy film produced and distributed through First National and directed by Ted Wilde. The film is a baseball-styled sports film centering on Babe Ruth and Anna Q. Nilsson.

The film was released in the short-lived Vocafilm sound-on-film process, presumably a music and effects soundtrack but no dialogue. The film is considered a lost film.

Synopsis
Babe Dugan, star player of the Angel baseball team, chews tobacco and gets his uniform dirtier than any other player. Vernie, the laundress who cleans his uniform every week, becomes concerned over his untidiness; Babe calls to apologize for unintentionally striking her with a ball during a game; and his pal, Peewee, falls in love with Vernie's friend, Georgia. On an outing to an amusement park, a roller coaster throws Vernie into Babe's arms; soon they are engaged, and Vernie plans to reform him. Scores of tobacco cubes and spittoons are pre-wedding gifts, and they precipitate a lovers' quarrel. But Babe takes the reform idea seriously, though his game slumps and he is put on the bench. At a crucial moment, Vernie relents and throws him a plug of tobacco; and consequently he delivers a four-base blow.

Cast
 Babe Ruth - 'Babe' Dugan
 Anna Q. Nilsson - Vernie
 Ethel Shannon - Georgia
 Louise Fazenda - laundry girl
 Arthur Stone - the laundry driver
 Lou Archer - Peewee
 Tom McGuire - Angels team manager
 Mickey Bennett - mascot
 James Bradbury, Sr. - ball player
 Guinn 'Big Boy' Williams - a baseball player
 James Gordon - a baseball player
 Ralf Harolde - Baseball Fan (uncredited)
 Helen Parrish - Babe Dugan's daughter

See also
 Headin' Home (1920), also starring Babe Ruth
 Breaking into the Big League (1913)
 Casey at the Bat (1927)

References

External links
 
 Babe Comes Home at SilentEra
 Posters to the film
 

1927 films
Babe Ruth
Cultural depictions of Babe Ruth
American silent feature films
American sports comedy films
Lost American films
Films directed by Ted Wilde
Transitional sound comedy films
First National Pictures films
American black-and-white films
American baseball films
1920s sports comedy films
1927 lost films
Lost sports comedy films
1927 comedy films
1920s American films
Silent American comedy films
Silent sports comedy films